Ngong is a town near the Ngong Hills along the Great Rift Valley within Kajiado County, located in the southwest of Nairobi, in southern Kenya.  The word "Ngong" is a Maasai word derived from the word "enkong'u' meaning "the 'eye' of water" or spring from where Rhinos came to drink water. Therefore, the original name of Ngong was "enchoro e'muny", meaning the spring of the rhinos. The Maasai also refer to a spring as the "eye" of water. A widespread false etymology is linked with the knuckle shape of the hills.

The Ngong Hills, (known to the Maasai as 'Oloolaiser") from the eastside slopes, overlook the Nairobi National Park game reserve and, off to the north, the city of Nairobi.  The Ngong Hills, from the westside slopes, overlook the Great Rift Valley dropping over 4,000 feet below, where nomadic Maasai live.

Demographics
, the population of Ngong Town consisting of Enchorro-Emunyi and Ngong Township locations is 25,866. The elevation of Ngong town is 1,961 meters in altitude, but the altitude of the hills is about 2,460 meters above sea level. Ngong was the central town of Ngong division while Kajiado County was a district.

History
During the years of British colonial rule, the area around the Ngong Hills was a major settler farming region, and many traditional colonial houses are still seen in the area.

Today Ngong and its environs is a well-developed outskirt providing a good residing place for many of Nairobi's workers

Ngong division consists of the Nairobi suburbs of Ongata Rongai, Kiserian,[Matasia] (Oloolua Area) and Kitengela where the residents are primarily Nairobians who build houses in the more quiet regions of the city.

In the 1985 film Out of Africa, the four peaks of the Ngong Hills appear in the background of several scenes at Karen Blixen's house, located near Ngong.  Local residents still reported seeing lions in the Hills during the 1990s.

The solitary grave of Denys Finch Hatton, marked by an obelisk and garden, is located on the eastern slopes of the Ngong Hills at a place called Kahara, overlooking the vast game reserve.

Former and current world marathon athletes, including all time champion Paul Tergat reside here.

It is the see city of the Roman Catholic Diocese of Ngong.

Sports
Ngong has a basketball court and a stadium that is being built.
The basketballers of Ngong go to far places to play basketball. 
Ngong also has quite a good number of football pitches.

Ngong division consists of the Nairobi suburbs of Ongata Rongai, Kiserian,[Matasia] (Oloolua Area) and Kitengela where the residents are primarily Nairobians who build houses in the more quiet regions of the city.

Transport

Ngong has a train station on the Nairobi–Malaba Standard Gauge Railway, which was inaugurated in October 2019.

Notes

External links
 Photo of Ngong Hills from game reserve: showing entire ridge, with Rift Valley behind [Kijabe.org].
 Photo of Ngong Hills from Blixen lawn: showing yard left of Karen Blixen house, with Ngong Hills behind [from AAA-Calif.com].
 Photo of Ngong Hills from Great Rift Valley: showing severe drop, with Nairobi suburbs on opposite side [PBase.com].
 Photo of Ngong Hills from Great Rift Valley, closeup: showing vegetation, suburbs [full webpage from PBase.com].

Populated places in Kajiado County